Furtei is a comune (municipality) in the Province of South Sardinia in the Italian region Sardinia, located about  northwest of Cagliari and about  east of Sanluri.

Furtei borders the following municipalities: Guasila, Samassi, Sanluri, Segariu, Serrenti, Villamar.

Demographic evolution

References

External links

 www.comune.furtei.ca.it

Cities and towns in Sardinia